The 1929 Akron Zippers football team was an American football team that represented the University of Akron in the Ohio Athletic Conference (OAC) during the 1929 college football season. In its third season under head coach Red Blair, the team compiled a 9–1 record (7–1 in conference), shut out seven of ten opponents, and outscored all opponents by a total of 158 to 21. Harold Frye was the team captain.

Schedule

References

Akron
Akron Zips football seasons
Akron Zippers football